The Grind is a left tributary of the river Unirea in Transylvania, Romania. It flows into the Unirea in the village Unirea.

References

Rivers of Romania
Rivers of Cluj County
Rivers of Alba County